This is a list of WBI bids by school.

The list is updated through the 2017 Women's Basketball Invitational.

See also
NCAA Women's Division I Tournament bids by school
NCAA Men's Division I Tournament bids by school
NIT bids by school
CBI bids by school
CIT bids by school

References

College women's basketball records and statistics in the United States